Canterbury Castle is a Norman Castle in Canterbury, Kent, England. It is a five-minute walk from Canterbury East Station and main bus station around City Wall.

Canterbury Castle was one of the three original Royal castles of Kent (the other two being Rochester Castle and Dover Castle). They were all built soon after the Battle of Hastings, on the main Roman road from Dover to London. This was the route taken by William the Conqueror in October 1066, and they were built originally as motte-and-bailey castles to guard this important route.

Phases

Norman era
A wooden motte and bailey castle was erected in 1066 - its motte may be the mound which is still visible in the Dane John gardens near the stone castle (which may in turn be a Roman burial mound), with Dane John deriving from donjon.

Stone castle
The great stone keep was largely constructed in the reign of Henry I as one of three Royal castles in Kent. This massive structure, which has dimensions of about 98 by 85 feet externally at the base, was originally probably at least 80 feet high. It is mainly made of flint and sandstone rubble. By the 13th century the castle had become the county gaol. It was given up to the invading French in the First Barons' War. In 1380 a new gate was built.

By the 19th century it had been obtained by a gas company and used as a storage centre for gas for many years, during which time the top floor was destroyed.

Tourist attraction
The Castle has been owned by the local authority since 1928. It has been closed because of falling masonry since 2018, although there were tentative plans for its restoration and reopening in 2021. However, as of March 2023, it remains closed.

Images of Canterbury Castle

Governors of Canterbury Castle
The Governors were responsible for the upkeep and security of the castle, which passed into private hands at the end of the reign of King James VI and I (1625).
1216–1232: Hubert de Burgh, 1st Earl of Kent (also Governor of Dover and Rochester Castles)
1232–: Stephen de Segrave (also Governor of Rochester Castle)
1259–: Nicholas de Moels (also Governor of Rochester Castle)
1261–: Robert Walerand (also Governor of Rochester Castle)
1272–: William de Eschetesford
 From the late 13th century onwards the castle was used as a gaol

References

External links

Canterbury Trust - Canterbury Castle
Norman Castle at Canterbury Castle
Archaeological and historical sources, reconstructions 

Castles in Kent
Tourist attractions in Kent
Castle
Ruins in Kent
Grade I listed buildings in Kent